Vag Magazine is an American feminist themed comedy web series starring Kate McKinnon, Jocelyn Guest, Nicole Drespel, and Sarah Claspell. Leila Cohan-Miccio and Caitlin Tegart are the comedic duos who came up with the idea and wrote Vag Magazine, filmed at Upright Citizens Brigade Theatre.  The six-episode web series directed by Zach Neumeyer and produced by Nicole Shabtai.

Overview
A group of feminists start their own magazine. They are a comedy based magazine that aims to speak on feminism. Vag magazine takes a comedic approach to feminism and aims to have content that derives to make people understand and care for what feminism stands for. As Katelyn said when interviewed in MS. More than a Magazine, a movement by Kathleen Richter, this satire approach to feminism has a goal of appealing  feminism to a larger group.

Cast list 
 Kate McKinnon
 Jocelyn Guest
 Nicole Drespel
 Sarah Claspell
 Leslie Meisel
 Veronica Osorio

References

External links

2010 American television series debuts
English-language television shows
American comedy web series
Feminist works